The 1932 FA Charity Shield was the 19th FA Charity Shield, a football match between the winners of the previous season's First Division and FA Cup competitions. The match was contested by league champions Everton and FA Cup winners Newcastle, and was played at St James' Park, the home ground of Newcastle United. Everton won the game, 5–3.

Match details

References

1932
Charity Shield
Charity Shield 1932
Charity Shield 1932
Comm
FA Charity Shield